St Bricin's Military Hospital is a military hospital  in Arbour Hill, an inner city area of Dublin, Ireland, serving members of the Irish Defence Forces and under the administration of the Army's Medical Corps.

History
The hospital was founded as Arbour Hill Military Hospital and built in three stages from 1902 replacing an older military hospital on the site. Designed by the Royal Engineers of the British Army, it was named the King George V Hospital (‘KGVH’) to mark the 1911 coronation and Irish visit of the king before it opened in 1913 and was administered by the Royal Army Medical Corps (RAMC). It was part of an extensive complex of British military and support facilities west of Dublin city centre for the British garrison in Ireland. This included the Royal Barracks, to which it was connected by a tunnel via Arbour Hill Detention Barracks (built to hold military offenders), Marlborough Barracks, Montpelier Hill Barracks and Isolation Hospital, and the Royal Irish Constabulary Depot in the Phoenix Park. It was transferred to the authorities of the new Irish Free State in 1922. The hospital was renamed after Saint Bricín of Tomregan, because of his skill as a surgeon in 7th century Ireland.

In 2005 consideration was given to making the hospital available for public use to ease pressure on accident and emergency departments.

References

See also
 List of Irish military installations

Military hospitals
Hospitals in Dublin (city)
Irish Army